Thomas Paterson (1882–1952) was an Australian farmer and politician.

Thomas Paterson may also refer to:

Thomas Macdonald-Paterson (1844–1906), Australian politician
Thomas J. Paterson (1805–1885), United States politician
Thomas Wilson Paterson (1851–1921), Lieutenant Governor of British Columbia
Tom Paterson, Scottish comic artist 
Thomas Paterson (footballer) (1874–?), Scottish association footballer
Tom Paterson (footballer) (1874–1945), Australian rules footballer for Collingwood
Tommy Paterson (born 1954), English former footballer
T. T. Paterson (Thomas Thomson Paterson, 1909–1994), curator of the Museum of Archaeology and Anthropology, University of Cambridge

See also 
Thomas Patterson (disambiguation)